Restigouche County (2016 population 30,955) is located in north-central New Brunswick, Canada. The county is named for the Restigouche River which flows through the county and is famous for its salmon pools, which have attracted wealthy American and Canadian tourists to the region's summer colonies for decades. Forestry dominates the local economy.

Census subdivisions

Communities
There are nine municipalities within Restigouche County (listed by 2016 population):

First Nations
There are two First Nations reservations in Restigouche County (listed by 2016 population):

Parishes
The county is subdivided into eight parishes. (Listed by 2016 population, excluding municipalities):

note: Grimmer Parish has been dissolved and amalgamated as part of the Rural Community of Kedgwick, effective July 2012.

Demographics

Language

Access routes
Highways and numbered routes that run through the county, including external routes that start or finish at the county limits:

Highways

Principal Routes

Secondary Routes:

External Routes:
 Quebec Route 132

Protected areas and attractions

Notable people

See also
List of communities in New Brunswick
Popelogan River
Upsalquitch River
Upsalquitch Northwest River

References

External links
Restigouche County Guide

 
Counties of New Brunswick